This is a list of notable artists who were born in Wales and/or known for their work in Wales, arranged alphabetically by surname (and period)

Born before 1800
Thomas Barker (1769–1847), painter born in Pontypool
Frances Bunsen (1791–1876), Monmouthshire painter
John Gibson (1790–1866), sculptor born near Conwy, moved to Italy to study (and work) in 1817
Thomas Jones (1742–1803), landscape painter born in Radnorshire
Edward Owen (died 1741), painter Anglesey
Richard Wilson (1713–1782), landscape painter and one of the founder members of the Royal Academy Montgomeryshire

Born 1800–1899
Thomas Brigstocke (1809–1881), portrait painter
Francis Dodd (1874–1949), painter and printmaker
Vincent Evans (1896–1976), painter from Ystalyfera
James Milo Griffith (1843–1897), sculptor
John Griffiths (1837–1918), painter who worked in India 
Fanny Price-Gwynne (1819-1901), poet, author, and writer. 
Sir Frank William Brangwyn (1867–1956) painter and muralist
Nina Hamnett (1890–1956), Tenby-born artist and artists' model, who exhibited at the Royal Academy
George Frederick Harris (1856–1924), painter who lived and married in Merthyr Tydfil
James Dickson Innes (1887–1914), Llanelli-born painter
Augustus John (1878–1961), Tenby-born portrait painter, draughtsman and etcher
Goscombe John (1860–1952), sculptor
Gwen John (1876–1939), Haverfordwest-born painter who moved to live and work in France in 1903
Thyrza Anne Leyshon (1892–1996), Swansea born miniature painter
 Edith (1963–1946) and Gwenddolen Massey (1864–1960), botanists and painters born on Anglesey, known as the Massey Sisters
Sir Cedric Morris (1889–1982), born in Swansea but left Wales age 17 
Thomas E. Stephens (1885–1966), portrait painter, emigrated to the US
T. H. Thomas (1839–1915), painter and illustrator active in Cardiff
Evan Walters (1892–1951), painter
Henry Clarence Whaite (1828–1912), English artist who settled (and married) in North Wales, forming the Cambrian Academy of Art
John Laviers Wheatley (1892–1955), Abergavenny-born painter
Christopher Williams (1873–1934), portrait and landscape painter
Margaret Lindsay Williams (1888–1960), portrait painter
Penry Williams (1805–1885), Wales-born painter who lived and worked in Rome from 1827

Born 1900–1924

Brenda Chamberlain (1912–1971), Welsh artist, working in Wales and Greece
Glenys Cour (born 1924), painter and stained glass artist
Thomas Nathaniel Davies (1922–1996), painter, sculptor and educator
Arthur Giardelli (1911–2009), London-born painter, moved to Wales in the 1940s, chair of the 56 Group Wales
Ray Howard-Jones (1903–1996), painter
Joan Hutt (1913–1985), Hertfordshire-born painter who moved to live in North Wales in 1949
Joan Baker (1922–2017), painter who was the first woman to run a major art department in Wales
Alfred Janes (1911–1999), painter 
Ezzelina Jones (1921-2012), sculptor 
Jonah Jones (1919–2004), sculptor 
Heinz Koppel (1919–1980), Berlin-born painter who moved to Wales as a young man
Mervyn Levy (1915–1996), painter, art dealer, writer and critic
Eric Malthouse (1914–1997), Eric Malthouse painter, printmaker and co-founder of the 56 Group Wales.
Stanley Cornwell Lewis MBE (1905–2009), portrait painter and Principal of Carmarthen School of Art
John Petts (1914–1991), London born artist living in Wales after 1937
Ceri Richards (1903–1971), Swansea-born painter
Will Roberts (1907–2000), painter
Graham Sutherland (1903–1980), English painter who regularly visited Wales, settling in Pembrokeshire in 1967
David Tinker (1924–2000), painter and co-founder of the 56 Group Wales.
Kyffin Williams (1918–2006), painter

Born 1925–1949
Mac Adams (born 1943), conceptual artist and sculptor, based in New York City 
John Beard (born 1943), Aberdare-born painter who emigrated to Australia in 1983
John Bourne (born 1943), English artist educated in North Wales, founder of the Wrexham group of the Stuckists art movement
Jim Burns (born 1948), painter and illustrator
David Carpanini (born 1946), Abergwynfi, Afan Valley. Painter, etcher, teacher and printmaker. 
Ivor Davies (born 1935), painter, mixed media, installation and mosaic artist
Ken Elias (born 1944), painter born in Glynneath
Barry Flanagan (1941–2009), known for his sculptures of hares
Valerie Ganz (1936–2015), painter
Tony Goble (1943–2007), painter
David Griffiths (born 1939), portrait painter
Robert Alwyn Hughes (born 1935), painter
Aneurin M. Jones (1930–2017), painter
Colin Jones (1928–1967), painter 
Gwilym Prichard (1931–2015) painter 
Mary Lloyd Jones (born 1934), painter
Mike Jones (1941–2022), painter
Christine Kinsey (born 1942), painter
John Knapp-Fisher (1931–2015), painter living and working in Pembrokeshire for almost 50 years
Geoffrey Olsen (1943–2007), painter born in Merthyr Tydfil
Rob Piercy (born 1946), painter from Porthmadog
Peter Prendergast (1946–2007), landscape painter.
Osi Rhys Osmond (1943–2015), painter, educator and TV presenter 
Terry Setch (born 1936), London-born painter who moved to Wales in 1964
Robert Thomas (1926–1999), bronze sculptor, known for his Cardiff public art 
John Uzzell Edwards (1937–2014), painter from the Rhymney Valley
Andrew Vicari (1932–2016), painter
Annie Williams (born 1942), still life watercolour painter who grew up in Wales
Ernest Zobole (1927–1999), painter, one of the founders of 56 Group Wales
Ogwyn Davies (1925-2015), painter, ceramist and teacher

Born 1950–1974

Iwan Bala (born 1956), painter and mixed media artist, winner of the National Eisteddfod of Wales Gold Medal for fine art in 1997
Laura Ford (born 1961), sculptor born in Cardiff
David Garner (born 1958), installation artist
Clive Hicks-Jenkins (born 1951), painter
Martyn Jones (born 1955), painter
Elfyn Lewis (born 1969), painter, winner of the National Eisteddfod of Wales Gold Medal for fine art in 2009
Eleri Mills (born 1955), painter
Phil Nicol (born 1953), painter, winner of the National Eisteddfod of Wales Gold Medal for fine art in 2001
Michael Gustavius Payne (born 1969), painter
Shani Rhys James (born 1953), Australia-born painter, moved to Wales after graduation
Phil Rogers (born 1951), potter from Newport
Alia Syed (born 1964), Swansea-born artist and filmmaker, now living and working in London
Charles Uzzell Edwards (born 1968), international graffiti artist
Bedwyr Williams (born 1974), installation and performance artist
Sue Williams (born 1956), visual artist
Pete Fowler (born 1969), artist, animator and sculptor

Born 1975 and later

Manon Awst (born 1983), sculptor, performance artist
Nichola and Sarah Hope (both born 1985)
Dan Rees (born 1982), Welsh-born sculptor, painter and photographer
Nathan Wyburn (born 1989), food artist

See also
List of Welsh women artists

References

 
Welsh artists
Artists